Crystal is the third studio album by American country music artist Crystal Gayle. The album rose to the number 7 spot on the Billboard Country Albums chart. It was released on August 6, 1976. It contained four charting singles, including two number 1 hits: "You Never Miss a Real Good Thing (Till He Says Goodbye)" and "Ready for the Times to Get Better." Another single, "I'll Do It All Over Again," just barely missed being the third chart-topper, stalling out at number 2, while "One More Time (Karneval)" could only rise to number 31.

Track listing

Personnel
Crystal Gayle – vocals 
Chris Leuzinger, Jimmy Colvard - electric guitar
Allen Reynolds, David Kirby, Garth Fundis, Jimmy Colvard - acoustic guitar
Lloyd Green - steel guitar, resonator guitar
Buddy Spicher - fiddle
Joe Allen - bass
Bobby Wood - keyboards
Charles Cochran - keyboards, string and horn arrangements
Jimmy Isbell - drums, percussion
Allen Reynolds, Garth Fundis, Sandy Mason, Crystal Gayle - backing vocals
Billy Puett, Dennis Good, Don Sheffield - horns
Carl Gorodetzky, Gary Vanosdale, George Binkley III, Lennie Haight, Marvin Chantry, Roy Christensen, Sheldon Kurland - strings
The Trolley Car Band - special effects

Charts

Weekly charts

Year-end charts

References

Crystal Gayle albums
1976 albums
Albums produced by Allen Reynolds
United Artists Records albums